The province of Carbonia-Iglesias was a province in the autonomous region of Sardinia, Italy. It included the historical area of Sulcis-Iglesiente and it was the smallest province of Sardinia. It is bordered by the provinces of Cagliari and Medio Campidano. All three provinces (Carbonia-Iglesias, Cagliari, and Medio Campidano) have been suppressed by the regional decree in 2016. 

The provincial president was Salvatore Cherchi. It had two provincial capitals, Carbonia and Iglesias, with populations of 29,007 and 27,332 as of 2015, respectively.

History
Colonies in the province were established by the Phoenicians and Carthaginians in the 9th or 8th centuries BC. Its mining industry developed during the nineteenth century due to its barium, copper, lead, silver and zinc deposits, but this industry fell into decline after World War II. It was formed in 2001 by a Sardinian regional law and became functional in 2005.

On 6 May 2012 the regional referendums of Sardinia took place regarding the abolition of certain provinces and a variety of other matters. The suggestion of reforming or abolishing certain provinces in Sardinia was approved by the Regional Council of Sardinia on 24 May 2012. Due to this, the province of Carbonia-Iglesias was ordered to form a new administrative body or be abolished on 1 March 2013, but this expiry date for constitutional changes was extended to 1 July 2013. It has not been abolished as a regional law regarding it has not yet been created.

Government

List of presidents of the province of Carbonia-Iglesias

References

External links
Provincia di Carbonia-Iglesias

 
Carbonia